Udit Narayan Jha (born 1 December 1955)  is a playback singer who works in  Bollywood and whose songs have been featured mainly in Hindi language, Nepali  and Bollywood movies. Besides Nepali and Hindi, he has sung in 36 languages. He has won three National Film Awards and five Filmfare Awards. He is the only male singer in the history of the Filmfare Awards to have won over three decades (winning in the 80s, 90s, and 2000s). Udit Narayan was awarded the Padma Shri in 2009  and, in 2016, he was awarded the Padma Bhushan by the Government of India, an honour that has so far been awarded to only a handful of singers, in recognition of his achievements in various film industries across India. He was also awarded the Prabal Gorkha Dakshin Bahu by the late King of Nepal Birendra Bir Bikram Shah Dev in 2001 and Chitragupta Cineyatra Samman 2015 for Bhojpuri Cinema. He has sung over 25000 songs over 36 languages as many as 21 of his tracks feature in BBC's "Top 40 Bollywood Soundtracks of all time".

Bollywood selected discography

1999 International khiladi "yaar maine ek sapna dekha" solo aadesh shrivastav

2004 madhoshi " o jaane jaana " sadhna sargam roop Kumar rathore

2005 Garam Masala "falak dekhoon (reprise)" pritam

2008 black & white "yeh hindostan hai" sukhvinder Singh

2003 chupke se "koi to ho" unknown

2004 dil mange more "Maine chun liya" shreya ghoshal himesh reshmiyya

2003 dil pardesi ho gaya "tu kaun kaha se" usha khanna

See also
 List of songs recorded by Udit Narayan
 List of regional songs recorded by Udit Narayan

References

Udit Narayan
Narayan, Udit